HT-29 is a human colon cancer cell line used extensively in biological and cancer research.

Characteristics

Initially derived in 1964 by Jorgen Fogh from a 44-year-old Caucasian female, HT-29 cells form a tight monolayer while exhibiting similarity to enterocytes from the small intestine. HT-29 cells overproduce the p53 tumor antigen, but have a mutation in the p53 gene at position 273, resulting in a histidine replacing an arginine. The cells proliferate rapidly in media containing suramin, with corresponding high expression of the c-myc oncogene. However, c-myc is deregulated, but may have a relation with the growth factor requirements of HT-29 cells.

Applications
In preclinical research, HT-29 cells have been studied for their ability to differentiate and thus simulate real colon tissue in vitro, a characteristic that has made HT-29 useful for epithelial cell research. The cells can also be tested in vivo via xenografts with rodents. HT-29 cells terminally differentiate into enterocytes with the replacement of glucose by galactose in cell culture, and with the addition of butyrate or acids, the differentiation pathways can be closely studied along with their dependence on surrounding conditions. Accordingly, studies of HT-29 cells have shown induced differentation as a result of forskolin, Colchicine, nocodazole, and taxol, with galactose-mediated differentiation also causing the strengthening of adherens junctions.

Culturing
Though HT-29 cells can proliferate in cell culture lacking growth factors with a doubling time of around 4 days, the doubling time can be reduced to one day with added fetal bovine serum. The cells have high glucose consumption, and in standard medium containing 25 mM glucose and 10% serum, remain undifferentiated.

References

External links
Cellosaurus entry for HT-29

Human cell lines
Colorectal cancer